The Brookville BL20CG is a diesel-electric locomotive built by the Brookville Equipment Corporation. The original BL20CG is a rebuilt EMD GP38 which formerly belonged to the Maine Central Railroad and is used by Brookville as a demonstrator. The BL20CG is a low emissions locomotive.

External links 
Brookville Equipment "CoGen" Genset Switchers
Brookville Equipment's CoGeneration Locomotive

B-B locomotives
Diesel-electric locomotives of the United States
EPA Tier 2-compliant locomotives of the United States
Brookville locomotives
Rebuilt locomotives
Standard gauge locomotives of the United States
Unique locomotives